Félix Geoffrion,  (October 3, 1832 – August 7, 1894) was a Canadian notary and politician.

Born in Varennes, Lower Canada, the son of Félix Geoffrion and Catherine Brodeur, he was trained and practised as a notary. He was elected to the Legislative Assembly of the Province of Canada in 1863. In 1867, he was elected to the 1st Canadian Parliament representing the riding of Verchères. A Liberal, he served until his death in 1894. From 1874 to 1876, he was the Minister of Inland Revenue.

Electoral record 

By-Election on Mr. Geoffrion being appointed Minister of Inland Revenue:

|- 
  
|Liberal
|Félix Geoffrion
|colspan=3 align="center"|acclaimed

References
 
 

1832 births
1894 deaths
Liberal Party of Canada MPs
Members of the House of Commons of Canada from Quebec
Members of the Legislative Assembly of the Province of Canada from Canada East
Members of the King's Privy Council for Canada
People from Varennes, Quebec